The Helles clan is a Palestinian extended family that became known in 2008 for its violent conflict with the de facto Hamas military government in the Gaza Strip. It is politically aligned with the Fatah party, which controls the politics of the West Bank, and became a suspected key player in the July 26, 2008 bus bombing in Gaza City which killed five members of the Izz ad-Din al-Qassam Brigades, the armed wing of Hamas.

Fight against Hamas and Flight to Israel 
On August 2, Hamas retaliated against the Hilles clan by raiding the predominantly Hilles neighborhood of Sajaiyeh in Gaza City; around nine people were killed in the ensuing gunfight and around 90 were injured. In the evening hours, the leader's brother of the clan (and former leader of the Tanzim faction of Fatah), Ahmed Hilles, led around 188 members of the clan to Nahal Oz and two other border crossings between Gaza and Israel, where they laid down their weapons and were stripsearched by Israeli troops before they were allowed onto Israeli soil; many of the wounded who fled to the border crossing, including Ahmed Hilles, were admitted to hospitals. Four were admitted to Soroka Medical Center in Beersheba for heavier injuries, while eleven others were admitted to Barzilai Medical Center in Ashkelon with lighter injuries.

While in hospital, Ahmed Hilles stated that Hamas had attacked his clan "because it doesn’t want to see such a big and strong family like mine." Furthermore, he hinted that the Hilles clan would retaliate against Hamas.

Return of fugitives 
On August 3, dozens of the Hilles clan militants were sent back to Gaza; despite an agreement between the Abbas government in the West Bank on not transferring Fatah-aligned fugitives back to Gaza, Mahmoud Abbas requested that the members of the Hilles clan be sent back. Upon arrival, some of the members of the clan were arrested and detained by Hamas militants. 87 other members of the clan were transported in a two-bus convoy to Jericho in the West Bank. IDF spokesperson Brig.-Gen. Yoav Mordechai stated that there was no threat of a major escalation of hostilities arising from the transportation of the Hilles family members to Jericho.

References 

People from Gaza City
Palestinian families